Yanque (possibly from Quechua for clay, Yanki means "exchange" or "North American" in Quechua) is a  mountain in the Andes of Peru. It is located in the Junín Region, Yauli Province, Carhuacayan District, and in the Lima Region, Huaral Province, Atavillos Alto District. It lies southwest of Tuctococha and northeast of the peak of Alcay.

The little lake west of the mountain is named Isco (possibly from Aymara and Quechua for lime).

References

Mountains of Peru
Mountains of Junín Region
Mountains of Lima Region
Lakes of Peru
Lakes of Junín Region